Nueva  is one of 28 parishes (administrative divisions) in Llanes, a municipality within the province and autonomous community of Asturias, in northern Spain.

Villages
Nueva
Ovio 
Llamigo 
Picones 
Riensena

References

Parishes in Llanes